The 1936 Davidson Wildcats football team was an American football team that represented Davidson College during the 1936 college football season as a member of the Southern Conference. In their first year under head coach Gene McEver, the team compiled an overall record of 5–4, with a mark of 4–3 in conference play, and finished in seventh place in the SoCon.

Schedule

References

Davidson
Davidson Wildcats football seasons
Davidson Wildcats football